Caltanissetta (or ) is a comune in the central interior of Sicily, Italy, and the capital of the Province of Caltanissetta. Its inhabitants are called Nisseni.

In 2017, the city had a population of 62,797. It is the 14th largest comune in Italy measured by area, the sixth highest comune in Italy by elevation (568 m), the second highest elevation in Sicily after the city of Enna (912 m).

Its patron saint is Archangel Michael.

Geography
 
The town lies in an area of rolling hills with small villages and towns, crossed by the river Salso. It borders on the municipalities of Canicattì, Delia, Enna, Marianopoli, Mazzarino, Mussomeli, Naro, Petralia Sottana, Pietraperzia, San Cataldo, Santa Caterina Villarmosa, Serradifalco and Sommatino. Its frazioni are the villages of Bifaria, Borgo Petilia, Borgo Canicassè Casale, Cozzo di Naro, Favarella, Prestianni, Villaggio Santa Barbara, Santa Rita and Xirbi.

Territory
Caltanissetta dominates the whole valley of the river Salso, which extends to include the nearby Enna. Morphologically  it  matches the surrounding area, very harsh and composed of limestone and clay. The city lies between three hills (Sant'Anna, Monte San Giuliano, and Poggio Sant'Elia), which form a basin which comprise part of the historical centre and South.

The Maccalube of Terrapelata
The Maccalube (singular: Maccaluba, from Arabic  maqlūbah, '(a land) that turns over', from the verb  qalaba 'to turn over, to turn upside down, to invert') are a particularly rare phenomenon of sedimentary volcanism occurring in the Terrapelata area of Caltanissetta, the so-called Hill of the Volcanoes, near the village of Santa Barbara. This is an area of barren hills, with a colour ranging from white to dark grey, where mud volcanoes of around one meter in height rest on volcanic sediment. The phenomenon is related to the presence of extensive underground clay deposits, interspersed with layers of salt water. 
Maccaluba is created by ejection of methane gas bubbles under pressure. 
When gas breaks through the clay deposits, it creates channels as it rises to the surface. These channels permit the clay sediment and water to travel, especially when they are pressured from beneath. 
The consistency of the soft clay and water 'sludge' erupting as a mixture then forms a clay cone on the surface, the top of which is similar in appearance to a volcanic crater. These formations remains soft for some time, unlike the igneous rock eruptions and cones often associated with volcanoes such as Mount Etna.

The Maccalube Emergency of August 2008

On 20 August 2008 a State of Emergency was declared because of events involving the Santa Barbara district in Caltanissetta in the preceding days.
During the morning of August 11, 2008 geological instability caused the opening of rifts in the ground surface, varying from ten centimetres to a metre in diameter. Damage to buildings occurred in two areas up to  distant, the Maccalube and in the western part of the City Centre.
These damages were made worse by an eruption of clay-mud, water and gas which occurred some hours later that same day.
On August 19, the first manifestations of further Maccalube eruptions appeared on top of the mud layer, where water and mud had been ejected by the previous eruption.

The Terrapelata phenomenon has been known for at least two centuries. 
The local Abbot, Salvatore Li Volsi (1797–1834), an expert in natural and agricultural sciences, wrote Sul vulcano aereo di Terrapilata in Caltanissetta ("Regarding the aerial volcano of Terrapelata in Caltanissetta"). He describes similar events which had occurred between 1783 and 1823, which he attributed to large-scale instability in the area. 
In recent decades these events have gradually become less violent, creating relatively inactive Maccalube, rather than violent eruptions and rifts in the terrain. 
As of September 2008: 68 craters out of 98 were said to be active; 17 were dormant; those remaining were thought to have solidified.

The events of August 11 are similar to those of February 14 and 15, 2002. Those of August were characteristic of a more severe eruption and of instability of the terrain beneath the populated area of the town. These events had, in the past, extended even further into the city area; but they had never before happened at the same time as eruptions.

History
Caltanissetta's origins can be traced back to 406 BC, when admiral Nicia of Hamilcar's siege force from Carthage established a fort at the site, later called Castra Nicia (Fort Nicia).

After the Second Punic War, Castra Nicia came under Roman rule, but as in the rest of Sicily, the influence of the invaders remained superficial.

In AD 829, the city was occupied by the Saracens. The Carthaginian name, similar to the Arabic word  nisā’ (meaning 'women') resulted in the Saracen name  Qal‘at al-Nisā’ ('Fort of the Women'), since Italianized to Caltanissetta. The settlement was captured by the Normans in 1086. A charter was granted to the town in accordance with Count Roger Borsa's vast plan for the urbanisation of Sicily, and the urban plan that is still in evidence today was laid out. It is during this time that cannoli is believed to have been invented here.

After the Norman occupation the city was under the rule of the Hohenstaufen, the Anjou and the Aragonese kings, who gave it the title of 'County'. It was here that Frederick II of Sicily was proclaimed king. The city was the seat of another Parliament which aimed to settle the disputes which had arisen during the reign of Frederick III (1355–1377).

In 1407, King Martin I ceded the territory of Caltanissetta to Matteo Moncada II, of the noble Spanish House of Moncada, which already owned the estate of Paternò, and subsequently the area fell into great decay. Construction of the Cathedral began in 1539, and, notably, in 1566 a bridge was built over the Salso River. In this period the city began to expand outside the walls, with creation of the new areas of Santa Flavia, San Rocco degli Zingari and San Francesco. These included the medieval village of Arab origin. The areas were separated by two roads which crossed roughly perpendicularly to a central square (now Piazza Garibaldi): the current Corso Vittorio Emanuele (west-east) and the Corso Umberto I (north-south).

On July 8, 1718 the city was assaulted by Piedmontese troops, causing large loss of life to the population. In 1787 Johann Wolfgang Goethe visited Caltanissetta.

In 1812,  the Moncada seignory ended after a rule of 406 years, when the feudal constitution was abolished and Caltanissetta was turned into the 22nd Comarca of Sicily. In 1819 the city was declared to be the Capital of the province. However one year later it was sacked as a punishment for its loyalty to the House of Bourbon. In 1844 it was elevated to a Bishopric seat.

After many Nisseni had taken part in his Thousands  deeds, Giuseppe Garibaldi entered the city, together with Cesare Abba and Alexandre Dumas, père. On October 22 of the same year a Plebiscite declared Caltanissetta to be part of the new Kingdom of Italy.

After the Unification of Italy the area experienced an economic boom, largely due to extensive mining of sulfur. The mining was accompanied by various misfortunes: on the 27th of April 1867 47 people died due to a fire-damp explosion in the Trabonella mine; 65 miners died on November 12, 1881 in Gessolungo mine because of an explosion; and another 51 died in 1911 in Deliella and Trabonella mines.

In 1875, however, the population rose up against the Prefect, who was subsequently fired. On April 8, 1878 the city was connected to a railway, ending the historical difficulties in reaching it. Three years later the King Umberto I visited Caltanissetta along with his wife Margherita of Savoy and his son Victor Emmanuel III.

During the Second World War, as part of the Allied landing in Sicily( in July 1943), Caltanissetta suffered several bombings during which 351 civilians were killed. On July 10, 1943 U.S. 3rd Infantry troops landed in Licata and 8 days later, on 18 July they entered and occupied the city. The U.S. 1st infantry landed in Gela some hours later and advanced toward Catania to meet the U.S 45th Infantry, which had landed near Scoglitti.

Government

Economy
Caltanissetta's economy remained heavily reliant on agriculture until the 19th century, when sulfur mining industry began extensively. 275 sulfur mines were created in the province, employing 32,000 workers. Fratelli Averna SpA, a firm  in the city, produces the Amaro Averna, a liqueur sold throughout Italy and beyond.

Main sights

The city's monuments include:
Palazzo Moncada: erected in 1635 by the Count Guglielmo Moncada. This was not completed as Guglielmo left Sicily upon his appointment as Viceroy of Valencia. The façade is finely decorated with noteworthy friezes, in zoomorphic and anthropomorphic baroque styles.

Cathedral of Santa Maria la Nova: built between the years 1560–1620, was opened to the public in 1622. The façade was only completed in the year 1840. The church has a late-Renaissance appearance that breaks the characteristic Baroque mold usual to Sicily. The interior features frescoes by Guglielmo Borremans, who worked there from 1722. Other works include a wooden Blessed Virgin draped with silver lamina (1760) and a poly-chromatic wooden statue of St. Michael the Archangel by the sculptor Stefano Li Volsi, which is located in a large aisle chapel, along with two marble statues portraying Archangels Gabriel and Raphael, sculpted by Vincenzo Vitaliano. The Treasury houses a fine silver monstrance from the 15th century.
Sant'Agata al Collegio: church built alongside Jesuit college (collegio). The main altar built with poly-chrome marbles was built between 1600 and 1610, in late-Renaissance style, on the site of a previous church, which had also been dedicated to St. Agatha. The façade was created by Natale Masuccio, and is decorated with frameworks on a light coloured background. It has a Greek cross plant, with splendid Baroque decorations including frescoes by Luigi Borremans (18th century). The work on the adjacent Jesuit College began in 1589 and were completed in the second half of the 19th century.

San Sebastiano: church dates from the 16th century and is located in Piazza Garibaldi, in front of the Cathedral. It was built as a tribute to said Saint by the people in gratitude for deliverance from the plague. In 1711 it was altered along its whole length to make space for the Piazza Garibaldi. As a result, a new façade was designed by Pasquale Saetta in the late 19th century. It is embellished with columns employing all three classical architectural orders: Doric bases, Ionicin central sections and Corinthian crowns. There are also niches containing statues of the sculptor Francesco Biangardi, who worked in Caltanissetta during the late 19th century. The centre sculptures represent the saints Peter and Paul; the upper band shows San Sebastian pierced with arrows, being created in memory of his martyrdom.
San Domenico: church (16th century, with a convex façade from the 18th century), houses noteworthy paintings by Borremans and Filippo Paladini's (Madonna del Rosario). Paladini's painting depicting the Madonna del Carmelo is now situated in the Cathedral.
Palazzo Vescovile ("Bishop's Palace") is the seat of the Museum of Sacred Art. It has a painting by Gian Battista Corradini of the Madonna del Rosario (1614).
Santa Croce ("Holy Cross"): church dates originally from the 17th century, though substantially altered since.

Caltanissetta has three museums: the Diocesan Museum; the Mineralogical Museum; the Regional Archeological Museum. The latter holds displays mostly from prehistoric times and includes finds from archeological digs conducted in the 1950s. These include vases and tools from the Bronze Age, and early Sicilian ceramics.

Sites in the neighbourhood of Caltanissetta include:
Castle of Pietrarossa ("Red Stone Castle"): built using, as its name suggests, largely red stones, dominates the city and the whole Salso River valley from the edge of the ravine upon which it stands. Originally assumed to have been built at the time of Arab rule, it is currently generally accepted that the castle was built by the Byzantines between 750 and 800 AD.  During the Middle Ages the castle was a strategic stronghold.  Around the end of the 11th century the tomb of Queen Adelasia, niece of the Norman King Roger I, was placed here.  In 1378 a Parliament of The Barons was held there, to name the four vicars that were to govern Sicily (Government of the (Four Vicars) Benevento - Quattri Vicari, 1377-1410). In 1407, the castle become the property of the Moncada family from Spain, and thus began the Castle's subsequent period of decline. Having been deemed unsuitable as a noble residence, it was used only for military functions. At the end of the 15th century, the castle dungeons were used as prisons.  In 1567 a strong earthquake caused the collapse of the castle. Only the ruins of two towers, still visible today, remained standing.
Abbazia di Santo Spirito (Abbey of the Holy Spirit): Romanesque-style monastery built by the Norman Count Ruggero and his wife Queen Adelasia in 1092–1098, was consecrated in 1153. It has been greatly altered in subsequent centuries. The original Romanesque outlines are still identifiable its characteristic semicircular jutting apses can be seen. These are separated by flat pilasters and connected by a series of small arches. The left-hand entrance has a Gothic ogival portal from the 13th century. The lunette once contained a figure of Christ Blessing, which was eventually moved inside the Abbey. Notable are the rectangular nave and wooden-beamed ceiling. The walls and the apses have frescoes attributed to the 14th century. The vault of the apse shows a 17th-century figure of Christ Pantocrator.
The Archeological Park of Gibil Gabib, on a hill near the city, contains, amongst other things, the defense tower and parts of the perimeter walls dating back to the 6th century.

Transport
Caltanissetta is served by the A19 motorway Palermo-Catania, with an exit linking to the Town Centre via a highway. The town has two railway stations: Caltanissetta Centrale on the Caltanissetta-Agrigento line and Caltanissetta Xirbi, on the Palermo-Catania line.

Media
The RAI radio station of Caltanissetta is an inactive system for broadcasting in long, medium and short waves. Its main element is an omnidirectional antenna of 286 meters high, which holds the record for the tallest structure in Italy, it stands on the Sant'Anna hill of 660 m s.l.m.

On November 23, 2021, the Regional Department of Cultural Heritage and Sicilian Identity indicated to the Superintendence of Cultural Heritage of Caltanissetta, to initiate the new procedures for affixing the bond of cultural interest to the RAI radio antenna, deemed by local community and local organizations a strongly identifying element with a profound historical and cultural value.

International relations

Sister cities / twin towns
 Rochester, New York, United States (since 1965)
  Cittanova, Reggio Calabria, Calabria, Italy (since 2008)

Sport
In the 2021/2022 football championship, the two main teams are:
the Nissa Football Club, heir of the historical Nissa, in Excellence; 
the A.S.D. City of Caltanissetta, in Promotion. 

The city also hosts "Città di Caltanissetta" Tennis Tournament, part of the ATP Challenger Tour.

References

External links

 Caltanissetta official website
Caltanissetta at visitsicily.info
ISPRA Geological sheet 631 Caltanissetta
RAI transmitter antennas Caltanissetta

 
Municipalities of the Province of Caltanissetta
Sicilian Baroque
Norman architecture in Italy
406 BC
Populated places established in the 5th century BC
5th-century BC establishments in Italy